Stag Island is an uninhabited island in the southern part of James Bay, in the Qikiqtaaluk Region of Nunavut, Canada.

References

Uninhabited islands of Qikiqtaaluk Region
Islands of James Bay